Jesse V. Johnson is a British film director, screenwriter and stunt coordinator, born on 29 November 1971 in Winchester, England.

Johnson has made primarily action films. These include the 2009 revenge thriller The Butcher and the crime drama Charlie Valentine. He is also known for his collaboration with actor and martial artist Scott Adkins.

Prior to becoming a filmmaker, he worked as a stuntman and later a stunt coordinator. His stunt performing credits include: M:i:III, Charlie's Angels, Mars Attacks!, Planet of the Apes, Starship Troopers, War of the Worlds, Total Recall, The Thin Red Line and Terminator 3: Rise of the Machines. He worked as a stunt coordinator on Beowulf.

Filmography

References

1971 births
Living people
British film directors
British male screenwriters
English-language film directors